The Sierra Academy of Aeronautics is an aviation flight school headquartered in Atwater, California.  It operates its training facility at the former Castle Air Force Base in Atwater, California.  Sierra Academy was contracted by several foreign air carriers to perform pilot training, including Shanghai Airlines.

History
The Sierra Academy formerly was based at the Oakland International Airport, where it had hangars, offices, and classrooms. It was owned by the Everett family of Atherton, California.

In 1996, Hani Hanjour who would later fly a hijacked airliner into the Pentagon was admitted to the Sierra Academy of Aeronautics, but before beginning flight training, the academy arranged for Hanjour to take intensive English courses at ELS Language Center in Oakland. The flight school also arranged for Hanjour to stay with a host family, with whom he moved in with on May 20, 1996. Hanjour completed the English program in August, and in early September 1996, he attended a single day of ground school courses at the Sierra Academy of Aeronautics before withdrawing, citing financial worries about the $35,000 cost.

Two Korean business men, Dan and John Yoon, bought the company as open of an asset sale, and re-opened the flight school, operating under KS Aviation (KSA). 

In 2004, the new owners moved its Oakland program to the former Korean Airlines facility at the airport in Livermore, California(KLVK). The company took advantage of the growing Indian market and began accepting students from all over India. This was mostly a result of the declining U.S. based students who could no longer find funding for flight training. While the Livermore campus was running, KSA also opened up a large campus at Castle Airport (KMER, formerly Castle AFB) in 2005.  
In January 2007, the company started moving all remaining students and employees to its existing facilities at the former Castle AFB (KMER).  
In February 2014, The FAA proposed a civil penalty of $204,050 against Sierra for "allegedly operating nine Cessna 152 airplanes when they were not in compliance with Federal Aviation Regulations." The FAA alleged that Sierra  did not properly inspect the seat locking pins. An improperly engaged pin could lead to the seat slipping and the pilot losing control of the airplane.

Awards 
In 1992 the National Air Transportation Association (NATA) honored Sierra Academy of Aeronautics with the Excellence in Pilot Training Award. This national award, sponsored by Jeppesen Sanderson, provides recognition for "outstanding contributions in safety, professionalism, leadership, and excellence in the field of pilot training."

Notes

External links 

Aviation schools in the United States